Code page 1288 (CCSID 1288), also known as CP1288, DEC Turkish (8-bit) and TR8DEC, is one of the code pages implemented for the VT220 terminals. It supports the Turkish language.

Code page layout

See also
DEC Multinational Character Set (MCS)
8-bit DEC Greek (Code page 1287)
8-bit DEC Hebrew
8-bit DEC Cyrillic (KOI-8 Cyrillic)
7-bit DEC Turkish (TR7DEC)

References

1288
Digital Equipment Corporation